North Adams Country Club is a semi-private golf course located in Clarksburg, Massachusetts. The club hosts one of the oldest Invitational Singles Tournaments in New England.

History
North Adams Country Club was established in 1903 as the North Adams Businessman's Club, and a nine-hole golf course was originally built at Windsor Lake.  The land that presently comprises the North Adams Country Club was purchased in numerous installments from 1903 to 1911.  The present course was designed by Orrin E. Smith.  The existing clubhouse was built in 1952.

Course layout and hole descriptions
The course lies on rolling terrain, with several holes featuring considerable elevation changes.  The course is relatively short, with a premium being placed on accuracy off the tee.  The greens are generally small, and thus scoring can be largely dependent upon short game abilities.

The 1st hole is a par 4 dogleg left, with out of bounds coming into play on the right.  The second shot is downhill, with out of bounds on the left and in back of the green.  The green can be receptive to shots played short right, due to a mound which feeds shots toward the green.

The 2nd hole is an uphill par 3, featuring the most severely sloped green on the course.  The green slopes considerably from back to front, and has bunkers on the left and right sides.  Second shots played from above the hole during tournament conditions can be difficult, so it is often preferable to remain short of the hole.

The 3rd hole is a straight, downhill par 4.  A well struck tee shot could bring a lateral water hazard into play on the left, but anything in the fairway will likely catch a slope around 150 yards from the green and run out another 20-30 yards.  The green is guarded by two bunkers, and a water hazard comes into play if the approach shot flies the green.

The 4th hole is a short par 4, with the green being set to the left of a straight fairway, forming a slight dogleg left.  Since the fairway is narrow and tree lined, and a tee shot that is struck too well can carry past the dogleg, a driver is not necessarily an option off the tee.  The green is well protected by two bunkers, a tree that guards the green from any approach shots on the left hand side of the fairway, and a water hazard over the green.

The 5th hole is a par 5, with a unique layout.  In essence, the hole is double dogleg in the shape of an elongated and tall S.  On the tee, there is out of bounds right and lateral hazard on the left.  The ideal tee shot carries to the base of a hill, just to the right of the center of the fairway.  The second shot has out of bounds on the whole right side, and well struck second shots will tend to land and bounce left, but the left hand side of the fairway is the preferable angle to play the third shot into a green that has a bunker well short, and one just off the back right, as well as out of bounds over the back of the green.

The 6th hole is a par 4 which parallels the 3rd hole, and provides an excellent view of the course and clubhouse.  Out of bounds comes into play on the right.  A straight tee shot downhill will leave a short approach shot into a green which can be receptive to shots played short of the green.  Bunkers are located short left and just right of the green, and a water hazard is just over the green.

The 7th hole is a short par 4, with a slight dogleg right and out of bounds along the entire right side, as well as very small lateral hazard short and to the right of the green.  The pin location is visible on the walk to the tee, but the view of the green is blocked from the tee by large pine trees.  The ground between the tee box and approximately 70 yards short of the green includes a significant elevation drop into a ravine-like stream bed.  Thus, any tee shot which doesn't carry to the other side of the valley can roll back down the fairway, leaving a blind second shot.  However, a well struck tee shot can make this hole drivable, and one of the better birdie opportunities, particularly since shots which are just left of the green tend to bounce right.

The 8th hole is a straight par 3, with out of bounds right, and 2 bunkers short left and right, as well as 2 bunkers immediately to the left and right of the green.  The green tends to slope slightly from front to back.

The 9th hole is a par 5, and a fun finishing hole.  The tee shot is played to a tree lined fairway, which tends to bounce right.  If the tee shot is in position, the second shot will be over a small pond, to a reachable green which has out of bounds long left and in back of the green.  The green is one of the larger greens on the course, with several undulations, and is guarded by bunkers left and right.

Scorecard
North Adams Country Club is a 9-hole course, and the same holes must be played on both the front 9 and back 9 of an 18-hole round.  However, different tees are used on each hole during the back 9 of an 18-hole round.  Although the teeing ground is different on every hole, the same fairway and green are still played.  By changing the teeing ground, the hole can be significantly altered on the back nine.  At North Adams Country Club, this is most notable on the 1st and 9th holes, both of which are lengthened and the shot angle is altered on the back nine.  On the following score card, all measurements are in yards.

Invitational Singles

The North Adams Country Club Invitational Singles Tournament is one of the oldest Invitational Singles Tournaments in New England.

References

External links
 North Adams Country Club Official Site

1903 establishments in Massachusetts
Buildings and structures in Berkshire County, Massachusetts
Clarksburg, Massachusetts
Golf clubs and courses in Massachusetts
Sports in Berkshire County, Massachusetts
Sports venues completed in 1903
Tourist attractions in Berkshire County, Massachusetts